William Cunningham (2 October 180514 December 1861) was a Scottish theologian and co-founder of the Free Church of Scotland. He was Moderator of the Free Church in 1859.

Life

Cunningham was born in Hamilton, Lanarkshire the eldest son of Charles Cunningham a merchant and his wife Helen Cunningham. The family moved to Cheeklaw in the Scottish Borders and from there he attended Duns Academy.

He studied Divinity at the University of Edinburgh and was licensed by the Presbytery of the Church of Scotland in Duns in 1828 and was posted as assistant minister to the Middle Parish in Greenock. He was ordained as minister of that church in October 1831, where he remained for three years. In January 1834 he was translated to the first charge of Trinity College Kirk in Edinburgh. This move (to one of Scotland's most prestigious churches) was mis-timed inasmuch that the fate of the church was already sealed by Act of Parliament as the church was to be demolished to make way for Waverley Station.

Cunningham became a major advocate of a new Free Church and wrote extensively on the subject. Princeton University gave him an honorary doctorate (Doctor of Divinity) in 1842 in relation to his writing.

His transfer also coincided with the commencement of the period known in Scottish ecclesiastical history as the Ten Years' Conflict, and he left the Church of Scotland in the Disruption of 1843 to become one of the founders of the Free Church of Scotland, alongside Thomas Chalmers and Robert Smith Candlish.

Towards the end of 1843 he visited America to make the case for the Free Church and he raised some money there, having already received the degree of D.D. from Princeton University. Cunningham was appointed Professor of Theology at the New College, Edinburgh, before transferring to the chair of Church History in 1845, replacing Rev David Welsh. He succeeded Thomas Chalmers as Principal in 1847, serving in that position until his death, and was appointed moderator of the Free Church General Assembly in 1859.

Cunningham specialised in historical theology, and wrote a two volume work on the subject. An open source audio narration of the book is available. He also wrote The Reformers and the Theology of the Reformation. William Garden Blaikie suggested that he was the "ablest defender of Calvinism in his day" and that the "gentleness of his personal character was a striking contrast to his boldness and vehemency in controversy." Cunniingham has been described as a scholar and controversialist. According to the Encyclopædia Britannica Eleventh Edition, "his ... sympathies combined with his evident desire to be rigidly impartial qualifying him to be an interesting delineator of the more stirring periods of church history, and a skilful disentangler of the knotty points in theological polemics."

In later life Cunningham lived at 17 Salisbury Road in south Edinburgh. He died in Edinburgh and is buried beneath a large sarcophagus-style grave in the Grange Cemetery alongside the north path.

Family

On 15 July 1834 he married Janet Denniston (1810 - 2 March 1888)daughter of John Denniston of Greenock and 
Jean Fairrie, and had issue — 
Janet, born 7 June 1835 (married George Carphin, banker, Dunkeld), died 23 January 1913
Helen, born 14 April 1837 (married Robert Mackenzie, Dundee), died 15 November 1865
William, born 15 September 1839, died 16 October 1843
Jane Fairrie, born 4 May 1841, died 29 December 1894
John Denniston, M.D., born 11 December 1842, died 20 August 1871
Charles Gordon, merchant, born 9 July 1845, died 12 December 1894
Andrew Blackadder, born 1 August 1846, died 14 September 1852
William Robertson, born 9 September 1848, died 13 June 1849
Archibald, merchant, born 26 December 1849, died 12 February 1892
Elizabeth, born 3rd April 1851, died 6th September 1852
Mary Anne, born 7 January 1853.

Publications

Reply to the Statement of Certain Ministers and Elders, published in Answer to Dr Chalmers 1 Conference (Edinburgh, 1837)
Speech on the Independence of the Church (Edinburgh, 1839)
Letter to John Hope (Edinburgh, 1839)
Tracts On the Intrusion of Ministers (Edinburgh, 1839)
Defence of the Rights of the Christian People in the Appointment of Ministers (Edinburgh, 1840)
Strictures on the Rev. James Robertson's Observations upon the Veto Act (Edinburgh, 1840)
Letters on the Church Question in Answer to Mr Robertson of Ellon (Edinburgh, 1842)
Animadversions on Sir William Hamilton's pamphlet, "Be not Schismatics," etc. (Edinburgh, 1843)
edited Bruce : s Sermons and Life (Edinburgh, 1843)
Introduction and Notes to Stillingfleet's Doctrines and Practices of the Church of Rome (1845) 
The Unchangeableness of Christ, a sermon (Edinburgh, 1853)
The Reformers, and the Theology of the Reformation (Edinburgh, 1862)
Historical Theology, 2 vols. (Edinburgh, 1863)
Discussions on Church Principles, 2 vols. (Edinburgh, 1863 )
Sermons, edited by J. J. Bonar (1872)
Theological Lectures, edited by Thomas Smith, D.D. (1878)

Memorials

A marble bust of Cunningham, sculpted by William Brodie stands in New College in Edinburgh.

Portraits by William Bonnar, Sir John Watson Gordon, and Edward Burton are held by the National Gallery of Scotland.

References
Citations

Sources

Further reading

1805 births
1861 deaths
19th-century Ministers of the Church of Scotland
19th-century Ministers of the Free Church of Scotland
Scottish Calvinist and Reformed theologians
19th-century Calvinist and Reformed theologians
Alumni of the University of Edinburgh
Academics of the University of Edinburgh
Reformation historians
People from Hamilton, South Lanarkshire
19th-century Scottish theologians
19th-century Scottish historians